Ó Maolchonaire, more properly Ó Maol Chonaire, sometimes Ó Mhaoilchonaire, Ó Maolconaire, etc., was the surname of a family of professional poets and historians in medieval Ireland. Traditionally it would have been spelled without the 'h', but with a dot over the 'c', either of which indicate aspiration. In a period prior to the surrender of the Ó Conchubhair Donn and the other Connacht chieftains, it was anglicised O'Mulconry; however, the family was required to drop the national prefixes as part of the terms of surrender. Specific families, particularly the educators, were systematically targeted as part of the plot to destroy the Irish culture and language, as well as the Catholic religion. This can add great confusion to researchers of this important literary and religious family. It is now rendered most commonly Conry, sometimes Conroy, possibly sometimes King. There are many distinct groups of Conroys, some of whom also, though less commonly, use Conry, which are Anglicisations of disparate Irish Gaelic names.

Overview
A bardic family descended from Maine of Tethba,  based in County Roscommon in Connacht, many members of the Ó Maol Chonaire family were successive Ollamh Síl Muireadaigh to the Síol Muireadaigh and other Irish dynasties from the 12th to 17th centuries. Their principal seat was at Cluaine na-hOidhche near Strokestown and their primary patron the Ó Conchobhair Donn, but they also served the MacDermot Kings of Magh Luirg, among many of the other principal chieftains of the Síol Muireadaigh, as well as various other dynasties throughout Ireland. As chiefly historians and poets of the royal variety, they had immense land holdings on account of their profession. In Gaelic Ireland the filídh and séanachie were held in high esteem, with the Ollamh considered to be of equal stature to the Ard-Rí.

Notability

Among their principal surviving works are the Annals of Connacht, which covers the years 1224 to 1544. Fearfeasa Ó Maol Chonaire was one of the "four masters" who were credited with compiling the Annals of the Four Masters. The family were also responsible for the literary manuscript now known as 23 N 10, and Egerton 1782.

Students of the family included John de Burgh, Archbishop of Tuam. In a much later period, William J. Higgins, Speaker of the Newfoundland House of Assembly, and leader of the Liberal-Labour-Progressive Party, was the student, law partner and protégé of Charles O'Neill Conroy, only son of James Gervé Conroy.

Flaithri Ó Maolconaire, also Florence Conry (Conroy, O'Mulconry), Irish Franciscan and theologian, founder of the College St. Anthony at Louvain, and Archbishop of Tuam.

Ollamh Síol Muireadaigh

Dúinnín Ó Maolconaire, d. 1231
Máeleoin Bódur Ó Maolconaire, d. 1266
Dubsúilech Ó Maolconaire
Tanaide Mor mac Dúinnín Ó Maolconaire, 1270–1310
Mael Sechlainn Ó Domhnalláin, Ollav of Sil-Murray in particular in poetry, and the most learned man in all Ireland in the same art, died of Fiolun in 1375
Tanaide Ó Maolconaire, d. 1385
Donnchad Baccach Ó Maolconaire, d. 1404
Flann Óc mac Séoan Ó Domhnalláin, d. 1404
Dauid mac Tanaide Ó Maolconaire, d. 1419
Cormac Ó Domhnalláin, d. 1436
Mailin mac Tanaide Ó Maolconaire, d. 1441
Sadhbh Ó Mailchonaire, d. 1447
Torna Ó Maolconaire, d. 1468
Urard Ó Maolconaire, d. 1482
Sigraid Ó Maolconaire, d. 1487
Mailin mac Torna Ó Maolconaire, d. 1519
Domhnall Ó Maolconaire, fl. 1487
Torna mac Torna Ó Maolconaire, d. 1532
Conchobar mac Domnall Ruad Ó Maolconaire, 1532–15??
Muirges mac Paidin Ó Maolconaire, d. 1543
Lochlainn mac Paidin Ó Maolconaire, d. 1551

Ó Maolchonaires in the Annals
 Néidhe Ó Maolchonaire, the historian, rested.., 1136 The Annals of Tigernach
 Maeleoin Bodar (the Deaf) O Mailchonaire took Cluain Bolcain this year, 1232
 Dauid mac Tanaide Ó Maolconaire, 1404–1419
 Donnchadh Ua Mail-Conaire the Fair, namely, ollam of the Sil-Muiredhaigh in history, died this year. Annals of Ulster, 1405
 Diarmait Ruad Ó Maolconaire, d. 1441
 Tanaide mac Mailin Ó Maolconaire, d. 1446
 Maelsechlainn mac Urard Ó Maolconaire, 1452
 Diarmait mac Domnall Ó Maolconaire, son of Domnall, son of Eoin, son of Sitrice Ruad, d. 1465
 M1487.9 Maurice, the son of Loughlin O'Mulconry, teacher of his own art poetry, died in Tirconnell, after a long illness, and after the victory of penance, and was interred at Donegal.
 M1488.44 Mulconry, the son of Torna O'Mulconry, died of a short fit of sickness at Cluain-na-hoidhche.
 M1489.40 Melaghlin, son of Loughlin O'Mulconry, died while on his bardic circuit through Munster.
 M1495.17 Donnell O'Mulconry, Ollav of Sil-Murray, died; and two O'Mulconrys were set up in his place, namely, John, son of Torna, and Donough, son of Athairne.
 M1506.10 Paidin O'Mulconry, only choice of Ireland in his time for history and poetry, died.
 M1519.10 Maoilin, son of Torna O'Mulconry, OIlav of Sil-Murray, a man full of prosperity and learning, who had been selected by the Geraldines and English to be their Ollav, in preference to all the chief poets of Ireland, and who had obtained jewels and riches of all from whom he had asked them, died in Mainistir-derg in Teffia.
 Lochlainn Ó Maolconaire
 Cu Choicriche Ó Maolconaire
 Sean Ó Maolconaire of Baile in Chuimine, fl. 1575
 Fintan mac Illann meic Dubhthach "intended ollave of Síl-Muiredhaigh," d. 1585
 Tuileagna Ó Maoil Chonaire, fl. c. 1585
 Senchán, d. 1588
 John Ruadh mac Lochlainn meic Paidin, d. 1589

Later descendants of the Ó Maol Chonaires

 John Conroy, Welsh-born Protestant, absentee landlord, baronet and comptroller to the Duchess of Kent, rumored true father of Queen Victoria
 James Gervé Conroy, lawyer, judge, and MHA for Ferryland and the Avalon Peninsula in Newfoundland, leader of the Anti-Confederation Party, founder and editor of the Irish Catholic newspaper Terra Nova Advocate
 Charles "Padre Carlos" O'Neill Conroy, Newfoundland-born, Montréal-educated, great-grandson of James Gervé Conroy, prominent Catholic missionary, mayor of Monsefú, Peru, in 1963

Genealogy

From 180.7, pp. 402–03, Leabhar na nGenealach, volume I.

 Brian Óg s. Maoilín s. Torna s. Maoilín s. Tanaidhe s. Páidín s. Néidhe s. Conaing Buidhe s. Tanaidhe Eólach s. Conaing Eólach s. Tanaidhe s. Duinnín s. Dúnlang Consoileach s. Maol Póil s. Maoilín Mear s. Maol Conaire, from whom is the family, s. Flaithfhile s. Brógan s. Dubh Dhá Thuath s. Flann s. Maol Dúin s. Forannán s. Ainmhire s. Criomthann s. Brian s. Maine s. Niall.

References

Sources

 The learned family of Ó Maolconaire, Paul Walsh (priest), Catholic Bulletin 26 (1936), pp. 835–42.
 The O'Maolconaire family, Edmund Curtis, Journal of the Galway Archaeological and Historical Society 19 (1941), pp. 118–46. 
 The O Maolconaire family: a note, E. de Lacy Staunton, J.G.A. & H. S. 20 (1942), pp. 82–88.
 Ballymulconry and the Mulconrys, M. J. Connellan, Irish Ecclesiastical Record 5th series, 90 (1958), pp. 322–30
 Marbhna ar Mhuiris Mac Torna Uí Mhaoilchonaire, Réamann Ó Muireadhaigh, Eigse 15:3 (1974), pp. 295–21.
 A New History of Ireland VIII: A Chronology of Irish History to 1976 – A Companion to Irish History Part I edited by T. W. Moody, F.X. Martin and F.J. Byrne, 1982. 
 Mac Dermot of Moylurg: The Story of a Connacht Family Dermot Mac Dermot, 1996.
 The Celebrated Antiquary Nollaig O Muralie, Maynooth, 1996. 
 The Encyclopaedia of Ireland 2003; .
 Irish Leaders and Learning Through the Ages Fr. Paul Walsh, 2004. (ed. Nollaig O Muralie).
 Muirgheas Ó Maolconaire of Cluain Plocáin: an early sixteenth-century Connacht scribe at work, Bernadette Cunningham and Raymond Gillespie, Studia Hibernica 35 (2008–09), pp. 17–43.
 The Uí Mhaoilchonaire of Thomond, Brian Ó Dálaigh, unpublished lecture delivered at Tionól, DIAS, 29 Nov. 2008.
 Fearfeasa Ó Maolconaire, in Dictionary of Irish biography (9 vols, Cambridge, 2009)
 Muiris Ó Maolconaire, in Dictionary of Irish biography (9 vols, Cambridge, 2009)
 "The Annals of the Four Masters: Irish history, kingship and society in the early seventeenth century, pp. 50–2, 244; 255–67, 286; 262–3; 263–8, 285; 256; also pp. 344–5, Bernadette Cunningham, Four Courts Press, 2010. .

External links
List of Published Texts at CELT – University College Cork's Corpus of Electronic Texts

Surnames of Irish origin
Gaelic-Irish nations and dynasties
Irish Brehon families
Irish-language surnames
Families of Irish ancestry